Kapu-Sens is a literary review published by the Africana Studies department California State University Northridge. It was started in 1969.

References

1969 establishments in California
California State University, Northridge
Literary magazines published in the United States
Magazines established in 1969
Magazines published in Los Angeles